RTÉ.ie is the brand name and home of Irish broadcaster Raidió Teilifís Éireann (RTÉ)'s online activities, located at the URL https://www.rte.ie/. The site began publishing on 26 May 1996. According to RTÉ, it operates on an entirely commercial basis, receiving none of the licence fee which funds much of RTÉ's activity. The site, it says, is funded by advertising and section sponsorship. However, RTÉ has had to defend itself from allegations of anti-competitiveness brought about by licence fee support.

, it was among the top 4,000 most visited websites globally, by Alexa rankings, and among the top 10 sites in Ireland with impressions of over 75 million per month and over 4 million unique users. A redesign of the website's home page, news and business sections took place on 13 October 2010.

Sections

News 

The News and Current Affairs Independent Business Unit is branded online, as on radio and television as RTÉ News. The news site was launched in 1998, with its own dedicated journalists. This section of the site offers access to all the news programmes broadcast by RTÉ on radio and on television. The archive offers streaming, in various quality back to 1999. The site employs sectioning of news items, poll features, numerous microsites such as for general elections, referendums, and throughout the national budget.

Sport 

RTÉ.ie Sport was founded in August 1999 and provides live-updating of scores across various disciplines, and covers the range of Irish sports along with major world events and other smaller sports and codes with an Irish interest.

Business 

Originally dubbed OnBusiness this section commenced in 2001 (now RTÉ Business). This section of the site provides business news from Ireland and also carries news stories from the wires.

Entertainment 

Originated from the A-C-E (Arts-Culture-Entertainment) site in 2000 (later RTÉ Interactive Entertainment then RTÉ Guide Entertainment) portal this section of the site provides access to celebrity news and gossip, there are photo galleries from recent international and Irish events. There are listings of movie-times, and a huge database of reviews. Music is also reviewed and promoted along with concerts. There is also a gaming section consisting mostly of gaming news and reviews. Theatre and book reviews are also presented. Along with blogs and other interactive cross-overs, this section is particularly active.

On 10 June 2010 at 10:10 RTÉ relaunched their Entertainment and RTÉ Guide websites. RTÉ TEN (The Entertainment Network) is the new name for RTÉ's online entertainment section. RTÉ TEN plans to be an entertainment news website for the social-media generation. It will connect with users through various social-media organisations such as Facebook and Twitter. RTÉ TEN introduces the RTÉ Guide's personalised TV Listings, which includes links to the RTÉ player's set of shows. Users can use Outlook or Google clanaders to TV listings and be able to invite friends to join them watching their favourite shows on social networking sites.

Television 

This section of the site provides access to listing of shows on all channels and also provides access to the mini-sites of RTÉ's broadcast programming including that produced in-house, commissioned and acquired internationally.

Radio 

Similar to the TV section of the site, rte.ie/radio provides access to the broadcasters four fm radio stations' live streams as well as dedicated station sites and programme micro-sites.

Archives and Library 

Access to themed selections from the RTÉ Libraries and Archives is also available through rte.ie, with new topics being added occasionally. Previous years' selections remain available, and cover radio back to the 1920s and television back to 1961.

Audio and video content

Live 

Regular live webcasting of RTÉ programmes began on 17 March 2007. All RTÉ News and Current Affairs programmes, such as Prime Time, as well as programmes like the Saint Patrick's Day Parade, are streamed live, usually with unrestricted access.

RTÉ News, an online rolling news service, can also be accessed through the site.

Much of the live video content on the site is restricted to the island of Ireland.

RTÉ player 

In April 2009, RTÉ launched a restricted on-demand television service. Its content is from RTÉ One, RTÉ2 and the RTÉ News channel. Its programmes include news, sport, soap operas and other television shows broadcast on RTÉ Television. The RTÉ player was initially restricted to the island of Ireland only. Since January 2010, visitors to the RTÉ player from outside Ireland have been able to access a range or programs which are cleared for international audiences.

Awards 
RTÉ.ie has won several Golden Spider Awards, including an Information Excellence Award (in 1999) and Best Media Service Website award (2004).

Former staff 

RTÉ.ie has seen a number of its journalists go on to further careers within RTÉ, elsewhere in the Irish media and further afield. Former staff and freelance online journalists have included:

 Neil Callanan, Real Estate reporter, Bloomberg News
 Steve Cummins, freelance music writer
 Donnacha DeLong, president, National Union of Journalists
 Blathnaid Healy, Content Manager, WorldIrish.com
 Caroline Hennessy, food travel and culture writer
 Sinéad Kissane, sports reporter, TV3
 Bill Lehane, online news reporter, Upstream oil and gas newspaper
 Siobhan Mannion, fiction writer and producer, RTÉ Radio 1's Arena
 Luke McManus, freelance television director
 Elizabeth O'Neill, researcher, RTÉ Radio 1
 Barry Whyte, editor, Institutionalinvestor.com

See also
Australia's SBS
CBC.ca the online service of the Canadian Broadcasting Corporation, CBC.

References

External links

RTÉ News
RTÉ Sport
RTÉ Entertainment

RTÉ Business
RTÉ Television
RTÉ Radio

RTÉ Libraries and Archives
RTÉ Live

Broadcasting websites
Irish entertainment websites
IE
IE
Web portals
Internet properties established in 1996